Zyryan may refer to:

For the town in eastern Kazakhstan, see Zyryanovsk.
For the administrative district of eastern Kazakhstan, see Zyryan District.
For the ethnic group known as the Komi-Zyrians in pre-Soviet Russia, see Komi people.
For their language, see Komi-Zyrian language.